Wucherer is a surname. Notable people with the name include:

Denis Wucherer (born 1973), German basketball coach and former player
Fritz Wucherer (1873–1948), Swiss painter
Gerhard Wucherer (born 1948), German sprinter
Ludwig Wucherer (1790–1861), German entrepreneur
Otto Edward Henry Wucherer (1820–1873), Brazilian physician and naturalist